Lucas Oil Rail Line is a  short line railway  that operates in Harrison County, Indiana between Corydon Junction and Corydon, a distance of 7.7 miles (12.39 km).

History 
On May 25, 2006, the former Louisville, New Albany & Corydon Railroad was sold by its then owner, BPM Rail, Inc., to the line's main customer, Lucas Oil. The line is now owned by a subsidiary of that company, Lucas Rail Lines, Inc. (LRL) and does business as Lucas Oil Rail Line (LNAL). NOTE: The correct reporting marks are LNAL - There are no LORL reporting marks in the Official Railway Equipment Register or railroad reporting marks database.

References

External links 
Lucas Oil Website

Indiana railroads
Railway companies established in 2006
Rail Lines